Sara Caroline Seger (born 19 March 1985) is a Swedish footballer who plays as a midfielder and club captain for FC Rosengård in the Damallsvenskan league. She is the current captain of the Swedish national football team.

Club career

Linköpings
An industrious central midfielder, Seger played for Linköpings FC from 2005 to 2009 and served as the club's captain. Linköpings finished in the top four of the Damallsvenskan in four of Seger's five seasons with the team. Their highest finishes were second place in 2008 and first place in 2009. The team also captured the Svenska Cupen on three occasions in 2006, 2008 and 2009.

While playing for Linköpings Seger was honoured as the Damallsvenskan's Rookie of the Year in 2005 and Midfielder of the Year in 2006 and 2009.

After the team finished second and qualified for the UEFA Women's Champions League, Seger signed a new one-year contract with Linköpings in the autumn of 2008. She was proud to lead the club to a league and cup "double" in her final campaign with the team. Seger also won the 2009 Diamantbollen, awarded to the year's best Swedish women's soccer player.

Seger's last game for Linköpings was a 2–0 defeat by Duisburg in the 2009–10 UEFA Women's Champions League.

United States
In September 2009, the expansion team Philadelphia Independence of Women's Professional Soccer (WPS) announced their intention to draft Seger with their first pick in the 2009 international draft. In December 2009, she signed a three-year contract with Philadelphia. Her first season with the Independence began in April 2010 and culminated in a 4–0 defeat to FC Gold Pride in the WPS Championship game. Seger scored one goal and posted five assists in her 18 appearances. She underwent surgery on a heel injury after the season.

Seger was traded to Western New York Flash in December 2010 in exchange for draft picks. She joined the franchise in their first season in the WPS and wore the captain's armband. On 14 August 2011 the Seger-led Flash secured the best record in the league, a bye in the playoffs, and played at home for the league championship on 27 August. They beat Seger's former club Philadelphia Independence in the Championship game, 5–4 in PKs after a 1–1 draw.

Seger played just 12 matches for the Flash, as the FIFA Women's World Cup took place during the season. She scored five goals and served one assist. Coach Aaran Lines was very happy with Seger's contribution, but her contract contained a release clause which allowed her to leave for a team outside the United States after one year.

Tyresö FF
In August 2011 Seger announced that she would join LdB FC Malmö on a short-term contract to cover the remainder of the 2011 Damallsvenskan season, although she remained undecided about her subsequent destination. Later that same month it was confirmed that Seger would join Tyresö FF on a two-year deal to start in the 2012 Damallsvenskan season. Her three goals in seven league games helped Malmö secure the 2011 Damallsvenskan title.

Seger collected her third Damallsvenskan title in 2012, after Tyresö's dramatic last day win over Malmö. Madelaine Edlund scored the winning goal after Seger's shot had hit the post. Seger and Tyresö were upset in the final of the Svenska Cupen, by Kopparbergs/Göteborg FC who won 2–1 after extra time. In early 2014 it became clear that Tyresö were in financial difficulty and could not afford to keep Seger and their other leading players.

In May 2014 Seger had been approached by Seattle Reign FC, who had obtained her rights for the National Women's Soccer League (NWSL), and two other American teams had expressed interest. She was also in transfer negotiations with Paris Saint-Germain Féminines.

Paris Saint-Germain
Seger sealed her move to Paris Saint-Germain in June 2014, signing a two-year contract. She left as Tyresö withdrew from the league and released all their players.

Olympique Lyon  
On 2 July 2016, Olympique Lyon announced the signing of Seger. In the 2016/17 season Seger helped Lyon win the Division 1 Feminine, the Coupe de France Feminine and the UEFA Women’s Champions League.

FC Rosengård
In 2017 Seger returned to Sweden by joining FC Rosengård in the Damallsvenskan league. She helped Rosengård win the Svenska Cupen Damer and finish second in the league.

International career
Seger made her first appearance for the senior Swedish national team in March 2005; a 2–1 defeat by Germany at that year's Algarve Cup. She intended to score the winning goal at UEFA Women's Euro 2005 in North West England. Although Seger was part of the team, she failed to score as Sweden lost to rivals Norway in extra time of the semi final.

Seger continued to be selected under new coach Thomas Dennerby and was part of the Sweden team surprisingly eliminated in the first round of the 2007 FIFA Women's World Cup. After that failure some experienced players retired and Seger was given a prominent role in the team. In July 2008 she overcame a thigh injury to take her place in the squad for the 2008 Beijing Olympics. In China she participated in the Swedes' 2–0 quarter-final defeat by Germany.

Impressed by Seger's work rate and positive attitude, Dennerby had appointed her as national team captain for a qualifying match with Italy in May 2008, when regular captain Victoria Sandell Svensson was injured. Sandell Svensson retired after Sweden's 3–1 defeat by Norway in the quarter-final of UEFA Women's Euro 2009 and Seger took over as full-time captain.

Seger led Sweden to third place at the 2011 FIFA Women's World Cup in Germany. She featured in Sweden's 3–1 semi-final defeat to eventual winners Japan in Frankfurt. Sweden secured third place by beating France 2–1 in Sinsheim, although Seger missed the game with a calf injury. Third place also ensured Sweden's qualification for the 2012 Olympic football tournament in London. Dennerby kept Seger in Sweden's Olympic squad for London, where they lost to France in the quarter-finals.

In October 2012, new national team coach Pia Sundhage decided that Seger and Lotta Schelin would share the captaincy. Sundhage named Seger in the squad for UEFA Women's Euro 2013, which Sweden hosted. Seger was disappointed when Sweden lost 1–0 to Germany in the semi-final.

Seger appeared in all 6 matches for Sweden at the 2016 Summer Olympics and won the Silver Medal after a 2–1 loss to Germany.

Seger became the captain of the National team after Lotta Schelin’s retirement from international football.

Seger led Sweden to the 2019 FIFA Women's World Cup hosted in France. On 6 July 2019, Seger played her 200th match with Sweden, facing England. The match was a 2–1 victory for Sweden, giving them third place in the World Cup.

International goals

Matches and goals scored at World Cup and Olympic tournaments

Matches and goals scored at European Championship tournaments

Personal life
Seger is an out lesbian, telling QX magazine in December 2013 that she was proud of her girlfriend. In previous years Seger had concealed her orientation, but decided to speak out to be a role model for others. She used to be in a relationship with fellow professional football player Malin Levenstad. She is the Seb Smith cousin.

Honours

Linköpings FC
Damallsvenskan: 2009
Svenska Cupen: 2006, 2008, 2009
Svenska Supercupen: 2009

Western New York Flash
Women's Professional Soccer: 2011

LdB FC Malmö
Damallsvenskan: 2011
Svenska Supercupen: 2011

Tyresö FF
Damallsvenskan: 2012

Olympique Lyon
Division 1 Féminine: 2016–17
Coupe de France Féminine: 2017
UEFA Women's Champions League: 2016–17

Sweden
FIFA Women's World Cup Third place: 2011, 2019 
Summer Olympics Silver Medal: 2016, 2020
Algarve Cup (Participated from 2005 to 2015): 2009

Sweden U19
 Nordic Cup: runner-up 2004

Sweden U17
 Nordic Cup: runner-up 2001, 2002

Individual
Sweden Breakthrough Player of the Year; 2005
Best Swedish Midfielder: 2006, 2009, 2010, 2014, 2015
Diamantbollen: 2009
FIFA Women's World Cup All-Star Team: 2011
UEFA Squad of the Tournament: UEFA Women's Euro 2013

References

Match reports

External links

 
 
  (archive)
  (archive)
  (archive)
 Caroline Seger at statsfootofeminin.fr 
 Caroline Seger at Paris Saint-Germain
 
 Caroline Seger at Linköpings FC 
 
 
 

Swedish women's footballers
1985 births
Olympic footballers of Sweden
Footballers at the 2008 Summer Olympics
Footballers at the 2012 Summer Olympics
Footballers at the 2016 Summer Olympics
Sportspeople from Helsingborg
Living people
Sweden women's international footballers
2007 FIFA Women's World Cup players
2011 FIFA Women's World Cup players
2015 FIFA Women's World Cup players
Swedish expatriate sportspeople in the United States
Philadelphia Independence players
Western New York Flash players
FIFA Century Club
Tyresö FF players
Damallsvenskan players
Linköpings FC players
FC Rosengård players
Swedish LGBT sportspeople
Lesbian sportswomen
LGBT association football players
Expatriate women's footballers in France
Paris Saint-Germain Féminine players
Olympique Lyonnais Féminin players
Medalists at the 2016 Summer Olympics
Olympic silver medalists for Sweden
Olympic medalists in football
Women's association football midfielders
Division 1 Féminine players
2019 FIFA Women's World Cup players
Footballers at the 2020 Summer Olympics
Medalists at the 2020 Summer Olympics
21st-century Swedish LGBT people
Women's Professional Soccer players
UEFA Women's Euro 2022 players
UEFA Women's Euro 2017 players